61st & Peña station (sometimes stylized as 61st•Peña) is a Regional Transportation District (RTD) commuter rail station on the A Line in Denver, Colorado. The station, accessible from Tower Road is located along Peña Boulevard, the sixth eastbound station from Union Station in Downtown Denver and first westbound from Denver Airport. It is about 28 minutes from Union Station and nine minutes from Denver Airport. 61st Avenue provides access from Tower Road to the station.

61st & Peña station has a Denver International Airport owned 800-stall private park-and-ride lot not managed by RTD; it is not served by TheRide bus routes, unlike other A Line stations.

The station, originally named "Peña Boulevard Station", was not originally in the public-private partnership construction and funding plans for the A Line. The station was a late addition to the A line project. 61st & Peña station opened on April 22, 2016, along with the rest of the A Line.

The area surrounding the station will be developed into a mixed-use, transit-oriented development called “Peña Station,” with offices and housing, part of a proposed airport city surrounding Denver International Airport.

References 

RTD commuter rail stations in Denver
2016 establishments in Colorado
Railway stations in the United States opened in 2016